The Main road 5 is a north–south First class main road in Hungary, that connects Budapest with Röszke (the border of Serbia). Most of the traffic was taken over by the M5 motorway.

The road, as well as all other main roads in Hungary, is managed and maintained by Magyar Közút, state owned company.

See also

 Roads in Hungary

Sources

External links

 Hungarian Public Road Non-Profit Ltd. (Magyar Közút Nonprofit Zrt.)
 National Infrastructure Developer Ltd.

Main roads in Hungary
Pest County
Bács-Kiskun County
Csongrád-Csanád County